Song of the Fishermen is an early Chinese silent film directed by Cai Chusheng in 1934, and produced by the Lianhua Film Company. The film, like many of the period, details the struggle of the poorer classes, in this case a family of fishermen who are forced to sing on the streets in order to survive.

A successful film, Song of the Fishermen played for 84 straight days in Shanghai. It was the first Chinese film to win a prize in an international film festival (Moscow Film Festival in 1935).

References

External links

Song of the Fishermen at the Chinese Cinema Web-based learning center at UCSD

1934 films
Chinese silent films
Lianhua Film Company films
1934 drama films
Films directed by Cai Chusheng
Chinese drama films
Chinese black-and-white films
Silent drama films